Hagere Mariamna Kesem (Amharic: ሀገረ ማርያም ከሰም) or alternatively called Hagere Mariam and Kesem, is a woreda in Amhara Region, Ethiopia. Part of the Semien Shewa Zone, Hagere Mariamna Kesem is bordered on the south by the Germama (or Kesem) river which separates it from Menjarna Shenkora, on the west by the Oromia Region, on the north by Angolalla Tera, on northeast by Asagirt, and on the east by Berehet. The administrative center of this woreda is Shola Gebeya; other towns include Kese Koremash.

Demographics
Based on the 2007 national census conducted by the Central Statistical Agency of Ethiopia (CSA), this woreda has a total population of 55,235, an increase of 20.72% over the 1994 census, of whom 28,394 are men and 26,841 women; 2,187 or 3.96% are urban inhabitants. With an area of 689.87 square kilometers, Hagere Mariamna Kesem has a population density of 80.07, which is less than the Zone average of 115.3 persons per square kilometer. A total of 11,891 households were counted in this woreda, resulting in an average of 4.65 persons to a household, and 11,499 housing units. The majority of the inhabitants practiced Ethiopian Orthodox Christianity, with 99.9% reporting that as their religion.

The 1994 national census reported a total population for this woreda of 45,754 in 8,642 households, of whom 23,554 were men and 22,200 were women; 1,149 or 2.51% of its population were urban dwellers. The two largest ethnic groups reported in Hagere Mariamna Kesem were the Amhara (96.78%), and the Oromo (3.09%); all other ethnic groups made up 0.13% of the population. Amharic was spoken as a first language by 96.74%, and Oromiffa was spoken by 3.17%; the remaining 0.31% spoke all other primary languages reported. The majority of the inhabitants practiced Ethiopian Orthodox Christianity, with 99.87% reporting that as their religion.

Notes

Districts of Amhara Region